Major-General Gerald Charles Hopkinson CB DSO OBE MC (27 May 1910 – 2 June 1989) was a British Army officer who commanded the 4th Division after seeing service in World War II.

Early life
Hopkinson was born in Wellington, Somerset to Captain Charles Reginald Thompson Hopkinson of the East Surrey Regiment, who was killed in action in September 1914, a month after the British entry into World War I, and Beryl Mary Stewart.

Military career
Educated at Haileybury, Hopkinson was commissioned in to the Royal Tank Corps in 1930. He served in World War II as Commanding Officer of the 44th Royal Tank Regiment and then, briefly, as acting Commander of 4th Armoured Brigade in early 1945. He became Commanding Officer of 1st Royal Tank Regiment in 1952. He was appointed Commander of 33rd Armoured Brigade in 1953, General Officer Commanding (GOC) of the 4th Division in 1957 and Director of the Royal Armoured Corps in 1959 before retiring in 1962.

References

British Army major generals
British Army personnel of World War II
Royal Tank Regiment officers
Companions of the Order of the Bath
Companions of the Distinguished Service Order
Officers of the Order of the British Empire
People educated at Haileybury and Imperial Service College
Recipients of the Military Cross
1910 births
1989 deaths
People from Wellington, Somerset
Military personnel from Somerset